Ella Smith (born 6 June 1983) is an English actress.

Early life
While at drama school, Smith was a winner of the Carleton Hobbs Award and has since performed in more than fifteen BBC Radio productions.

Career
Smith made her television debut in a 2006 episode of BBC hospital drama Holby City. She subsequently appeared in ITV drama Strictly Confidential, alongside Suranne Jones, in one episode as the character Tanya Melton.

Smith made her stage debut in the 2006 play The Pocket Orchestra at the Trafalgar Studios in London. She returned to the same venue in 2008 to play the title character in the UK premiere of Neil LaBute's Fat Pig.

In 2007, she was in Channel 4's Cape Wrath, in which she played the regular role of Jezebel Ogilvie, the daughter of Brenda Ogilvie (Melanie Hill). She also starred in ITV's series Sold as Phoebe.

In 2009, she appeared in the film St. Trinian's II: The Legend of Fritton's Gold, and in 2010, the film Womb and BBC TV's series Mistresses as Trudi's receptionist Steph. In 2011 she played various roles in Danny Boyle's production of Nick Dear's Frankenstein at the National Theatre.

In 2015 she played the role of Mia in the Channel 4 series Babylon. After a successful Kickstarter campaign, in 2016 Smith's short film Mdudu Boy premiered, featuring Kenyan footballer Victor Wanyama.

Filmography

Film

Television

Theatre

References

External links
 

English television actresses
English radio actresses
English stage actresses
English Shakespearean actresses
1983 births
Living people
Alumni of the Webber Douglas Academy of Dramatic Art
National Youth Theatre members